Eugenio Balanqué Llópiz (born 20 December 1968) is a retired Cuban decathlete. He won the 1993 Central American and Caribbean Games and took silver medals at the 1991 Pan American Games, the 1995 Pan American Games and the 1998 Central American and Caribbean Games. He also participated at the 1996 and 2000 Summer Olympics, without success.

Achievements

References

 
 
 trackfield.brinkster

1968 births
Living people
Cuban decathletes
Athletes (track and field) at the 1991 Pan American Games
Athletes (track and field) at the 1995 Pan American Games
Athletes (track and field) at the 1999 Pan American Games
Athletes (track and field) at the 1996 Summer Olympics
Athletes (track and field) at the 2000 Summer Olympics
Olympic athletes of Cuba
Pan American Games medalists in athletics (track and field)
Pan American Games silver medalists for Cuba
Central American and Caribbean Games gold medalists for Cuba
Competitors at the 1993 Central American and Caribbean Games
Competitors at the 1998 Central American and Caribbean Games
Central American and Caribbean Games medalists in athletics
Medalists at the 1991 Pan American Games
Medalists at the 1995 Pan American Games